The 2019 ASUN women's basketball tournament was the 33re edition of the ASUN Conference championship. It took place March 8, 13, and 17 in several arenas at campus sites. Florida Gulf Coast won the conference tournament championship game over Liberty, 72–49.

Format
The ASUN Championship is a three-day single-elimination tournament. Eight teams will compete in the championship, with the higher seeded team in each matchup hosting the game.

Seeds

Schedule

Bracket

See also
 2019 Atlantic Sun men's basketball tournament

References

External links
 Championship Details

Tournament
ASUN women's basketball tournament